Vincent van Gogh made many copies of other people's work between 1887 and early 1890, which can be considered appropriation art. While at Saint-Paul asylum in Saint-Rémy-de-Provence, France, where Van Gogh admitted himself, he strived to have subjects during the cold winter months.  Seeking to be reinvigorated artistically, Van Gogh did more than 30 copies of works by some of his favorite artists.  About twenty-one of the works were copies after, or inspired by, Jean-François Millet.  Rather than replicate, Van Gogh sought to translate the subjects and composition through his perspective, color, and technique.  Spiritual meaning and emotional comfort were expressed through symbolism and color.  His brother Theo van Gogh would call the pieces in the series some of his best work.

Background
During the winter months at Saint-Remy Van Gogh had a shortage of subjects for his work.  Residing at Saint-Paul asylum, he did not have the freedom he enjoyed in the past, the weather was too cold to work outdoors and he did not have access to models for paintings. Van Gogh took up copying some of his favorite works of others, which became the primary source of his work during the winter months. The Pietà (after Delacroix) marks the start of a series of paintings that Van Gogh made after artists such as Jean-François Millet, Honoré Daumier and Rembrandt. Millet's work, who greatly influenced Van Gogh, figures prominently in this series.  He wrote to Theo about these copies: "I started making them inadvertently and now find that I can learn from them and that they give me a kind of comfort. My brush then moves through my fingers like a bow over the strings of a violin – completely for my pleasure."

Several religious works, such as The Pietà, were included in the series, notable exceptions in his oeuvre. Saint-Paul asylum, housed in an old monastery, may have provided some of the inspiration for the specific subject.  The nuns devoutness sometimes annoyed him, but he did find solace in religion.  He wrote: "I am not indifferent, and pious thoughts often console me in my suffering."

Van Gogh Museum asserts that Van Gogh may have identified with Christ "who had also suffered and been misunderstood." They also offer the conjecture of some scholars of a resemblance between the Van Gogh and the red-bearded Christ in The Pietà and Lazarus in the copy after Rembrandt. However it is unknown whether or not this was Van Gogh's intention.

Copy after Émile Bernard
Émile Bernard, an artist and Catholic mystic, was a close personal friend to Van Gogh. Bernard influenced Van Gogh artistically several ways. Bernard outlined figures in black, replicating the look of religious woodcut images of the Middle Ages.  This resulted in a flattened, more primitive work. Van Gogh's Crows over the Wheatfield is one example of how Bernard's simplified form influenced his work. Bernard also taught Van Gogh about how to manipulate perspective in his work.  Just as Van Gogh used color to express emotion, he used distortion of perspective as a means of artistic expression and a vehicle to "modernize" his work.

As a demonstration of the sharing of artistic viewpoints, Van Gogh painted a copy in watercolor of a sketch made by Bernard of Breton woman. Van Gogh wrote to Bernard of a utopian ideal where artists worked cooperatively, focused on a common idea, to reach heights artistically "beyond the power of the isolated individual." As a means of clarification, he stated that did not mean that several painters would work on the same picture, but they will each create a work that "nonetheless belong together and complement each other."  The Breton Women is one of many examples of how Van Gogh and one of his friend's brought their unique temperaments and skills to a single idea.

Van Gogh wrote to Bernard his trade of the Breton Women to Paul Gauguin: "Let me make it perfectly clear that I was looking forward to seeing the sort of things that are in that painting of yours which Gauguin has, those Breton women walking in a meadow so beautifully composed, the colour with such naive distinction."  Gauguin made a work, Breton Women at a Pardon which was may have been inspired by Bernard's work of Breton women.

Copy after Virginie Demont Breton
Van Gogh painted a work of the engraving Man at Sea made by Virginie Demont-Breton, daughter of Jules Breton.  Her engraving was exhibited at the Salon of 1889. The picture depicts, almost entirely in shades of violet, a peaceful scene of a mother sitting by a fire with her baby on her lap.

Copy after Honoré Daumier
In 1882 Van Gogh had remarked that he found Honoré Daumier's The Four Ages of a Drinker both beautiful and soulful.

Van Gogh wrote to his brother Theo of Daumier's artistic perspective and humanity:  "What impressed me so much at the time was something so stout and manly in Daumier's conception, something that made me think It must be good to think and to feel like that and to overlook or ignore a multitude of things and to concentrate on what makes us sit up and think and what touches us as human beings more directly and personally than meadows or clouds." Daumier's artistic talents included painting, sculpting and creating lithographs.  He was well known for his social and political commentary.

Van Gogh made Men Drinking after Daumier's work in Saint-Remy about February 1890.

Copies after Eugène Delacroix

Background
Van Gogh, motivated by the book The Imitation of Christ which included depiction of Christ as a suffering servant, worked on reprises of Eugène Delacroix's Pieta and Good Samaritan. Rather than representing "a triumphant Christ in glory," he depicted Christ in his most perilous and painful period, his crucifixion and death. Of capturing the scenes of his religious work from long ago, Van Gogh described Delacroix's perspective of how to paint the historical religious figures:  "Eug. Delacroix, when he did a Gethsemane, had been beforehand to see what an olive grove was like on the spot, and the same for the sea whipped up by a strong mistral, and because he must have said to himself, these people we know from history, doges of Venice, crusaders, apostles, holy women, were of the same type as, and lived in a similar way to, their present-day descendants."

Delacroix's influence helped Van Gogh develop artistically and gain knowledge of color theory. To his brother Theo, he wrote: "What I admire so much about Delacroix... is that he makes us feel the life of things, and the expression of movement, that he absolutely dominates his colours."

Table of paintings

Copy after Gustave Doré
Prisoners' Round (after Gustave Doré) was made by Van Gogh at Saint-Paul asylum in Saint-Rémy.  This work like the reprises of Eugène Delacroix and Rembrandt's works, evokes Van Gogh's sense of isolation, like an imprisoned or dying man.  Although sad, there is a sense of comfort offered.  In a letter to his brother, Theo, Van Gogh mentioned that he found making it and Men Drinking (after Daumier) quite difficult.

Following Van Gogh's funeral, Émile Bernard wrote of the studies around his coffin:  "On the walls of the room where his body was laid out all his last canvases were hung making a sort of halo for him and the brilliance of the genius that radiated from them made this death even more painful for us artists who were there."  Of the Doré reprise, he said, "Convicts walking in a circle surrounded by high prison walls, a canvas inspired by Doré of a terrifying ferocity and which is also symbolic of his end. Wasn't life like that for him, a high prison like this with such high walls - so high…and these people walking endlessly round this pit, weren't they the poor artists, the poor damned souls walking past under the whip of Destiny?"

Copy after Keisai Eisen
While living in Antwerp Van Gogh become acquainted with Japanese wood block prints. In Paris, Keisai Eisen's print appeared on the May 1886 cover of Paris Illustré magazine which inspired Van Gogh to make The Courtesan. The magazine issue was entirely devoted to Japan.  Japanese author, Tadamasa Hayashi, who lived in Paris, acquainted Parisians with information about Japan.  In addition to providing information about its history, climate and visual arts, Hayashi explained what it was like to live in Japan, such as its customs, religion, education, religion, and the nature of its people.

Van Gogh copied and enlarged the image.  He created a bright yellow background and colorful kimono.  Influenced by other Japanese prints, he added a "watery landscape" of bamboo and water lilies.  Frogs and cranes, terms used in 19th century France for prostitutes, with a distance boat adorn the border.

Copies after Utagawa Hiroshige
In the mid-19th century Japan opened itself to trade, making Japanese art available to the west. The works of Japanese print makers, Hiroshige and Hokusai greatly influenced Van Gogh, both for the beautiful subject matter and the style of flat patterns of colors, without shadow.  Van Gogh collected hundreds of Japanese prints and likened the works of the great Japanese artists, like Hiroshige, to those of Rembrandt, Hals, and Vermeer. Van Gogh explored the various influences, molding them into a style that was uniquely his own.  The Japanese paintings represent Van Gogh's search for serenity, which he describes in a letter to his sister during this period, "Having as much of this serenity as possible, even though one knows little – nothing – for certain, is perhaps a better remedy for all diseases than all the things that are sold at the chemist's shop."

Hiroshige, one of the last great masters of Ukiyo-e, was well known for series of prints of famous Japanese landmarks.

Japonaiserie: Flowering Plum Tree (after Hiroshige)
The Flowering Plum Tree is believed to be the first of three oil paintings made by Van Gogh of Utagawa Hiroshige's Japanese woodblock prints.  He used color to emulate the effect of the printer's ink, such as the red and greens in the background and the tint of green on the white blossoms.  After he moved to Arles, Van Gogh wrote to his sister that he no longer needed to dream of going to Japan, "because I am always telling myself that here I am in Japan."

Japonaiserie: Bridge in the Rain (after Hiroshige)
Utagawa Hiroshige's Evening Shower at Atake and the Great Bridge woodcut, which he had in his collection,  inspired Van Gogh for its simplicity.  The cloudburst, for instance, is conveyed by parallel lines. Such techniques were revered, but also difficult to execute when creating the wood block stamp for printing.  By making a painting, Van Gogh's brushstrokes "softened the boldness of the Japanese woodcut."  Calligraphic figures, borrowed from other Japanese prints, fill the border around the image.  Rather than following the color patterns of the original woodcut print, he used bright colors or contrasting colors.

Copy after Jacob Jordaens
Van Gogh used Jordaen's subject and composition for his rendition of Cows. A later artist, Edward Hopper, also used Jordaen's Cows as a source of inspiration for his work. The painting is located at the Musée des Beaux-Arts de Lille in France. Jan Hulsker notes that the painting is a color study of an etching Dr. Gachet made of Jordaen's painting.

Copies after Jean-François Millet

Background
The "peasant genre" that greatly influenced Van Gogh began in the 1840s with the works of Jean-François Millet, Jules Breton, and others. In 1885 Van Gogh described the painting of peasants as the most essential contribution to modern art. He described the works of Millet and Breton of religious significance, "something on high."  A common denominator in his favored authors and artists was sentimental treatment of the destitute and downtrodden.  He held laborers up to a high standard of how dedicatedly he should approach painting, "One must undertake with confidence, with a certain assurance that one is doing a reasonable thing, like the farmer who drives his plow... (one who) drags the harrow behind himself.  If one hasn't a horse, one is one's own horse."  Referring to painting of peasants Van Gogh wrote to his brother Theo: "How shall I ever manage to paint what I love so much?"

Van Gogh Museum says of Millet's influence on Van Gogh: "Millet's paintings, with their unprecedented depictions of peasants and their labors, mark a turning point in 19th-century art. Before Millet, peasant figures were just one of many elements in picturesque or nostalgic scenes. In Millet's work, individual men and women became heroic and real. Millet was the only major artist of the Barbizon School who was not interested in 'pure' landscape painting."

Van Gogh made twenty-one paintings in Saint-Rémy that were "translations" of the work of Jean-François Millet.  Van Gogh did not intend for his works to be literal copies of the originals. Speaking specifically of the works after Millet, he explained, "it's not copying pure and simple that one would be doing. It is rather translating into another language, the one of colors, the impressions of chiaroscuro and white and black." He made a copy of The Gleaners (Des glaneuses) by Millet. 

Theo wrote Van Gogh: "The copies after Millet are perhaps the best things you have done yet, and induce me to believe that on the day you turn to painting compositions of figures, we may look forward to great surprises."

Table of paintings

Copies after Rembrandt
From Rembrandt, Van Gogh learned how to paint light into darkness.  Rembrandt's influence seemed present one evening in 1877 when Van Gogh walked through Amsterdam.  He wrote: "the ground was dark, the sky still lit by the glow of the sun, already gone down, the row of houses and towers standing out above, the lights in the windows everywhere, everything reflected in the water." Van Gogh found Rembrandt particularly adept at his observation of nature and expressing emotion with great tenderness.

It's not clear if Van Gogh was copying after particular Rembrandt works for his copies or the spirit of the figures he portrayed.  Examples of Rembrandt's angels and Lazarus are here for illustrative purposes.

In Van Gogh's version of The Raising of Lazarus (after Rembrandt), Christ is depicted symbolically through the sun to evoke the healing powers of faith.  Christ is further referenced in two ways by the setting and circumstance.  First, miraculously, he brought Lazarus back to life again.  It also foretold Christ's own death and resurrection. 
The painting includes the dead Lazarus and his two sisters. White, yellow and violet were used for Lazarus and the cave.  One of the women is in a vibrant green dress and orange hair.  The other wears a striped green and pink gown and has black hair.  Behind them is the countryside of blue and a bright yellow sun.

In The Raising of Lazarus (after Rembrandt), van Gogh drastically trimmed the composition of Rembrandt's etching and eliminated the figure of Christ, thus focusing on Lazarus and his sisters. It is speculated that in their countenances may be detected the likenesses of the artist and his friends Augustine Rouline and Marie Ginoux. Van Gogh had just recovered from a lengthy episode of illness, and he may have identified with the miracle of the biblical resurrection, whose "personalities are the characters of my dreams."

References

Bibliography
 Hulsker, Jan The Complete Van Gogh. Oxford: Phaidon, 1980. 

1889 paintings
1890 paintings
Paintings by Vincent van Gogh
Paintings of Saint-Rémy-de-Provence by Vincent van Gogh
Paintings of Paris by Vincent van Gogh
Series of paintings by Vincent van Gogh